is a Japanese athlete competing in the shot put and discus throw. She represented her country in the discus at the 2019 World Championships in Doha without reaching the final.

Her personal best in the discus of 59.03 metres is the current national record.

International competitions

Personal bests
Outdoor
Shot put – 16.57 (Fukui 2017)
Discus throw – 59.03 (Kitakyushu 2019) NR

References

1997 births
Living people
Sportspeople from Osaka Prefecture
Japanese female shot putters
Japanese female discus throwers
Competitors at the 2017 Summer Universiade
Competitors at the 2019 Summer Universiade
World Athletics Championships athletes for Japan
Japan Championships in Athletics winners
21st-century Japanese women